Paisa Paisa is a 2016 emotional thriller film directed by Joji Raechal Job and produced by Shiv Vilash Chaurasiya under banner of The Nine Films. The film stars Sachit Patil, Rajendra Chawla and Spruha Joshi.
 It was released theatrically on 20 May 2016.

Plot
The story takes place in two cities, Mumbai and Nagpur. The film takes place over the course of four hours. Rajiv (Ashish Newalkar) goes to Nagpur for an interview but falls into a trap in the few minutes he leaves the office to make a phone call. Desperate for money, he contacts his friend Ajay for help. Ajay who is in Mumbai, is having troubles with his own wife. She, Janhvi, is returning to him after having divorced. Ajay sets aside his plans to reconcile with his wife to help his friend, but ultimately fails to gather enough money to help Rajiv.

Cast
 Sachit Patil as Ajay
 Ashish Newalkar as Rajiv
 Spruha Joshi as Janhavi
 Vinita Joshi as Neha
 Milind Shinde
 Deepali Sayyed as Rickshaw Driver's Wife
 Pushkar Shrotri
 Pankaj Vishnu
 Rajendra Chawla

References

External links
 

2016 films
Indian thriller films
2010s Marathi-language films
2016 thriller films